Top Secret was a Polish magazine devoted to the subject of computer and video games, as well as to culture and events connected with them.

The first edition of the magazine was published between 1990-1996 by the Bajtek publishing cooperative, and it was the first magazine of this type in Poland. During that time, 54 issues were released. 

The second edition was published between 2002-2003 by the Polish division of Axel Springer as an attempt to restore the title. However, in this time, only four issues were produced, and the project was abandoned.

References

Further reading 

 Tak się pisało - historia prasy o grach komputerowych w Polsce

Bi-monthly magazines
Defunct magazines published in Poland
Magazines established in 1990
Magazines established in 2002
Magazines disestablished in 1996
Magazines disestablished in 2003
Magazines published in Warsaw
Monthly magazines published in Poland
Video game magazines published in Poland